The MR-63 (Matériel roulant 1963) was the first generation of rubber-tyred rolling stock of the Montreal Metro in the city of Montreal, Quebec, Canada. Based on the MP 59 of the Paris Métro in France, the trains were in use on three of Montreal's four Metro lines from 1966 until 2018.

Design and improvements 

In 1963, the Commission de transport de Montréal (CTM) awarded the MR-63 contract to Canadian Vickers over Montreal Locomotive Works (MLW), as Canadian Vickers had the support of the French company CIMT-Lorraine which helped to design the rubber-tired system used on some of the Paris Métro lines. Between 1965 and 1967, 369 MR-63 coaches were built at the Canadian Vickers shipyards in the Viauville neighbourhood of the Mercier–Hochelaga-Maisonneuve borough of Montreal, designed by Morley L. Smith for Guillon Designers Inc., founded by Jacques Guillon.

The first trains were introduced into service on October 14, 1966, on the opening of the Montreal Metro. During their time in service the fleet has undergone numerous technological and reliability upgrades, starting with the introduction of Automatic train operation in 1976 (with subsequent revisions of hardware and software), major refurbishments of all 336 in-service MR-63 coaches by AMF Technotransport at the Canadian National Pointe-Saint-Charles workshops between 1991 and 1993, solid-state door interlocks in 2003, modern ergonomic driver cabs with new digital dashboards, and automatic station announcements in 2005 (voiced by Michèle Deslauriers).

The MR-63 was identified with grey interiors, four ventilation hoods protruding over the roof of each car, two  360-V series traction motors that make a whining noise, and round cab headlights.

By the time of their withdrawal, Montreal's rolling stock were among the oldest still in use on any metro system in the world, at 52 years old.

Hitachi and Jeumont prototype trains 

In the early 1970s, two separate three-car trainsets had their original traction systems replaced with two chopper prototype traction systems, one manufactured by Hitachi (fitted onto elements 10, 11 and 12), and another manufactured by the Canron company based on a Jeumont original design (fitted onto elements 40, 41 and 42). The Hitachi chopper system fitted onto elements 10, 11 and 12 were subsequently changed back into their original traction systems a few years later. Jeumont elements 41 and 42 were however stored out of service until 2005 when they returned as trailer cars attached to other motor cars, where they remained in service until 2017, when they were retired alongside other MR-63s being replaced by MPM-10 trains. Jeumont element 40 was retired from service earlier than elements 41 and 42 because it needed to be cannibalised for spare parts for elements 41 and 42 that were no longer being manufactured. Jeumont element 40 has since then been used as part of the Just for Laughs festival.

The Canron-Jeumont chopper 3-car trainset produce an unusually loud 5-tone chorus as the train begins its initial acceleration out of the station. The frequencies used (90 Hz, 120 Hz, 180 Hz, 240 Hz, and 360 Hz) are similar to those produced by the current choppers in the MR-73 trains; this musically appealing sound became a signature of the metro and was later incorporated, by popular demand, into the 3-tone door closing chimes of the MR-73 and AZUR trains.

Reliability 

Furthermore, the entire metro is underground, with trains stored under cover at all times.

In later years, obsolete components and parts availability meant the trains gradually became less reliable, and ride quality deteriorated as suspension systems and rubber spring packs hardened with age. Poor ride quality was not attributed to the tires or tracks.

Motor design 

This control system also features a dynamic rheostatic braking mode that uses the motors to slow the train, turning the motors into generators and dissipating the resulting energy as heat in the rheostat grid.

Lines serviced

 Green Line (1966-2018)

 Orange Line (1966-2008, June 19, 2018)

 Yellow Line (1967-2018)

 Blue Line (June 21, 2018)

Previous Formation (As of June 21, 2018)

Accidents and incidents 
 In July 1967, a train operator fainted at the controls of a MR-63 train and hit the wall at the tail-end of the Yellow Line, due to the intense heat generated from the train heaters compounded by the insufficient air flow generated by the forced-air ventilation mounted on top of the train. As a result of said incident, air conditioning was subsequently installed in all MR-63 driver cabs and the forced-air ventilation inside the passenger cabins were modified to generate greater air flow.
 On December 8, 1971, a speeding MR-63 train crashed into a parked MR-63 train near Henri-Bourassa station on the Orange Line, causing a 17-hour inferno that destroyed 24 MR-63 coaches parked at the Henri-Bourassa tail tracks. 40-year-old train operator Gerard Maccarone was the sole fatality in this accident, which was later revealed to be caused by a jammed throttle that prevented the train from braking in time. This was at that time the deadliest subway accident ever to have occurred in Canada until the Russell Hill subway accident on the Toronto subway in 1995.
 On January 9, 1974, a series of tire blowouts on a 9-car MR-63 train led to a fire which occurred between Laurier and Rosemont stations on the Orange Line. No deaths resulted from said fire, although said train was completely destroyed.

Retirement 
By 2005, the original MR-63 Montreal Metro trains were around 40 years old, and maintenance costs were rising. Société de transport de Montréal (STM) indicated that these trains would be replaced by modern rolling stock in the coming decade. New MPM-10 Azur trains were ordered from a Bombardier Transportation and Alstom consortium, and these trains entered service in 2016. As Azur trains entered service, MR-63 trains were retired one by one. The last MR-63 trains were retired between the last few months of 2017 and June 2018.

On May 30, 2018, STM announced that after June 21, 2018, with 52 years of loyal service, all of its remaining MR-63 métro cars were being withdrawn from service. The milestone was underlined by a communication campaign and a "farewell tour" on all four Montreal Metro lines. The last original train was decorated with information about the cars and featured copies of posters from 1966 from its early operation. It was operated as part of normal morning and afternoon rush hour service on each line according to the following schedule:

Several MR-63 cars have been preserved, including car 81-502, the first MR-63 car delivered. This car is currently on display at Exporail, the Canadian Railway Museum, in Saint-Constant, Quebec, on October 12, 2018. The rest of the fleet are now undergoing a sustainable reclamation plan.

See also 
 List of driverless trains

References

External links  
 A Sustainable Reclamation Plan for MR-63 cars

Montreal Metro
Train-related introductions in 1966
Electric multiple units of Canada
750 V DC multiple units